Kipkelion West is a constituency in Kenya. It is one of six constituencies in Kericho County. It was split from the now defunct Kipkelion Constituency to create two constituencies that is Kipkelion West and Kipkelion East after the promulgation of the New Constitution in 2010.

Kipkelion West is made of 4 wards namely  Kipkelion ward, Kunyak Ward, Kamasian Wardand Chilchila ward.

Members of Parliament

References 

Constituencies in Kericho County